Biała (the feminine form of Polish biały 'white') may refer to:

Cities and towns in Poland

Greater Poland Voivodeship (west-central Poland)
Biała, Gmina Trzcianka
Biała, Gmina Wieleń
Biała, Kalisz County
Biała, Konin County

Łódź Voivodeship (central Poland)
Biała, Kutno County
Biała, Pajęczno County
Biała, Piotrków County
Biała, Zgierz County
Biała, Wieluń County
Biała Góra, Łęczyca County
Biała Góra, Poddębice County
Biała Rawska

Lower Silesian Voivodeship (south-west Poland)
Biała, Legnica County
Biała, Świdnica County
 Biała, former name of the town of Bielawa
Bielsko-Biała

Lublin Voivodeship (east Poland)
Biała, Lublin Voivodeship
Biała Podlaska
 Biała, former name of the town of Janów Lubelski

Masovian Voivodeship (east-central Poland)
Biała, Masovian Voivodeship
Biała Góra, Masovian Voivodeship

Pomeranian Voivodeship (north Poland)
Biała, Bytów County
Biała, Wejherowo County
Biała Góra, Pomeranian Voivodeship

Warmian-Masurian Voivodeship (north Poland)
Biała Góra, Warmian-Masurian Voivodeship
Biała Piska

West Pomeranian Voivodeship (north-west Poland)
Biała, Stargard County
Biała, Szczecinek County
Biała Góra, West Pomeranian Voivodeship

Other voivodeships
 Biała, in Opole Voivodeship (south Poland)
 Biała Krakowska, since 1950 part of Bielsko-Biała, in Silesian Voivodeship (south Poland)
Biała, Rzeszów, since 2009 part of Rzeszów, in Subcarpathian Voivodeship (south-east Poland)
Biała, Kuyavian-Pomeranian Voivodeship (north-central Poland)
Biała, Podlaskie Voivodeship (north-east Poland)

Natural places in Poland 
 Biała (Dunajec), tributary of the Dunajec
 Biała (Supraśl), tributary of the Supraśl
 Biała (Vistula), tributary of the Vistula
 Biała Głuchołaska, right tributary of Nysa Kłodzka
 Biała Góra, a hill near Miechów, in Lesser Poland
 Biała Lądecka, right tributary of Nysa Kłodzka
 Puszcza Biała, a forest between the Narew and Bug rivers, in Masovian Voivodeship

Other uses 
 Biala, New South Wales, a hamlet in Australia
 Biala (Hasidic dynasty), a Hasidic dynasty from Biała Podlaska
 Janice Biala, Polish-born American artist
 ZSU-23-4MP Biała, Polish self-propelled anti-aircraft gun

See also 
 Byala (disambiguation)
 Biela (disambiguation)

sr:Бјала (вишезначна одредница)